Pachora railway station serves Pachora in Jalgaon district in the Indian state of Maharashtra.

Electrification
Railways in the Pachora area were electrified in 1968–69.

Narrow-gauge railway 
The station also serves the Pachora–Jamner narrow-gauge railway.

Amenities

Amenities at Pachora railway station include: computerized reservation office, waiting room, benches, retiring room and book stall.

Gallery

See also
High-speed rail in India
Indian Railways
Jalgaon District
Rail transport in India
List of railway stations in India

References

External links 

History of Electrification 
The Gazetteers Dept Maharashtra

Railway stations in Jalgaon district
Railway junction stations in Maharashtra
Bhusawal railway division
Railway stations opened in 1863